Generation–recombination noise, or g–r noise, is a type of electrical signal noise caused statistically by the fluctuation of the generation and recombination of electrons in semiconductor-based photon detectors.

References

See also 

 Noise
 Noise (audio) – residual low level "hiss or hum"
 Noise (electronic) – related to electronic circuitry.
 Noise figure – the ratio of the output noise power to attributable thermal noise.
 Signal noise – in science, fluctuations in the signal being received.
 Thermal noise – sets a fundamental lower limit to what can be measured.
 Weighting filter
 ITU-R 468 noise weighting
 A-weighting
 List of noise topics

Noise (electronics)